Marcelo Aguiar is a Brazilian mixed martial artist. He competed in the Welterweight division.

Mixed martial arts career
Aguiar made his professional debut against John Cronk at World Vale Tudo Championship 4 on 16 March 1997, in the semifinals of the Vale Tudo 77kg tournament. He won the fight by a rear-naked choke, after almost ten minutes of continuous fighting, and advanced to the finals where he faced Antonio Santos. Aguiar won the tournament final by knockout, stopping Santos after just 49 seconds.

Aguiar was scheduled to face Hayato Sakurai at VTJ 1997: Vale Tudo Japan 1997 on 29 November 1997. The fight ended in a draw. The two of them fought a rematch at Shooto: 10th Anniversary Event on 29 May 1999. Sakurai won their second meeting by unanimous decision.

Aguiar's last professional bout was against Matt Hughes at UFC 26: Ultimate Field of Dreams on 9 June 2000. Hughes won the fight by technical knockout, after the ringside doctor stopped the fight near the end of the first round.

Mixed martial arts record

|-
| Loss
| align=center| 2-3-1
| Matt Hughes
| TKO (doctor stoppage)
| UFC 26: Ultimate Field of Dreams
| 
| align=center| 1
| align=center| 4:34
| Cedar Rapids, Iowa, United States
| 
|-
| Loss
| align=center| 2-2-1
| Hayato Sakurai
| Decision (unanimous)
| Shooto: 10th Anniversary Event
| 
| align=center| 3
| align=center| 5:00
| Yokohama, Kanagawa, Japan
| 
|-
| Loss
| align=center| 2-1-1
| Frank Trigg
| TKO (punches)
| Shooto: Las Grandes Viajes 3
| 
| align=center| 2
| align=center| 3:08
| Tokyo, Japan
| 
|-
| Draw
| align=center| 2-0-1
| Hayato Sakurai
| Draw
| VTJ 1997: Vale Tudo Japan 1997
| 
| align=center| 3
| align=center| 8:00
| Urayasu, Chiba, Japan
| 
|-
| Win
| align=center| 2-0
| Antonio Santos
| KO (punches)
| WVC 4: World Vale Tudo Championship 4
| 
| align=center| 1
| align=center| 0:49
| Brazil
| 
|-
| Win
| align=center| 1-0
| John Cronk
| Submission (rear naked choke)
| WVC 4: World Vale Tudo Championship 4
| 
| align=center| 1
| align=center| 9:49
| Brazil
|

See also
List of male mixed martial artists

References

External links
 
 

Year of birth missing (living people)
Living people
Brazilian male mixed martial artists
Welterweight mixed martial artists
Ultimate Fighting Championship male fighters